Aluminium nitrate is a white, water-soluble salt of aluminium and nitric acid, most commonly existing as the crystalline hydrate, aluminium nitrate nonahydrate, Al(NO3)3·9H2O.

Preparation 
Aluminium nitrate cannot be synthesized by the reaction of aluminium with concentrated nitric acid, as the aluminium forms a passivation layer.

Aluminium nitrate may instead be prepared by the reaction of nitric acid with aluminium(III) chloride. Nitrosyl chloride is produced as a by-product; it bubbles out of the solution as a gas. More conveniently, the salt can be made by reacting nitric acid with aluminium hydroxide.

Aluminium nitrate may also be prepared a metathesis reaction between aluminium sulfate and a nitrate salt with a suitable cation such as barium, strontium, calcium, silver, or lead. e.g. Al2(SO4)3 + 3 Ba(NO3)2 → 2 Al(NO3)3 + 3 BaSO4.

Uses 
Aluminium nitrate is a strong oxidizing agent. It is used in tanning leather, antiperspirants, corrosion inhibitors, extraction of uranium, petroleum refining, and as a nitrating agent.

The nonahydrate and other hydrated aluminium nitrates have many applications.  These salts are used to produce alumina for preparation of insulating papers, in cathode ray tube heating elements, and on transformer core laminates.  The hydrated salts are also used for the extraction of actinide elements.

It is used in the laboratory and classroom such as in the reaction
 Al(NO3)3 + 3 NaOH → Al(OH)3 + 3 NaNO3
It is, however, much less often encountered than aluminium chloride and aluminium sulfate.

References

External links 
 MSDS of nonahydrate
 Government of Canada Fact Sheets and Frequently Asked Questions:  Aluminum Salts

Aluminium compounds
Nitrates
Deliquescent substances
Oxidizing agents